Leptodactylus petersii (common name: Peters' thin-toed frog, in Spanish sapito de Peters, i.e. "Peters' toadlet") is a species of frog in the family Leptodactylidae. It is found widely in the Guianas and the Amazon Basin (Bolivia, Brazil, Colombia, Ecuador, French Guiana, Guyana, Peru, Suriname, and Venezuela). It has been confused with Leptodactylus podicipinus and Leptodactylus wagneri, complicating the interpretation of older records and accounts.

Etymology
The specific name petersii honors Wilhelm Peters, a German zoologist.

Description
Male Leptodactylus petersii measure  and females  in snout–vent length. The dorsum ranges from greenish or greyish brown to reddish brown and has irregular dark brown to black markings. There is also a dark, triangular inter-orbital mark. The dorsum bears many spicules and short, laterally oriented glandular ridges. The ventrum smooth and has a variable pattern consisting of white background and extensive grey to black mottling in an anastomotic pattern. The throat is dark grey and has white spots. The tympanum is relatively large; the supratympanic fold is distinct and reaches arm insertion. The iris is bronze to reddish brown. Fingers have absent or only weak lateral fringes, whereas the fringes are extensive on toes, which
also have basal webbing. Males have two large spines on their thumbs.

Habitat and conservation
Leptodactylus petersii are found in tropical rainforest, forest edge, open areas, savanna enclaves in the tropical rainforest, and open cerrado formations below . This nocturnal frog is usually found on the ground near water. Eggs are laid in a foam nest near water, to which the tadpoles will later move.

This common species occurs in many protected areas and is not considered threatened by the IUCN.

References

petersii
Amphibians of Bolivia
Amphibians of Brazil
Amphibians of Colombia
Amphibians of Ecuador
Amphibians of French Guiana
Amphibians of Guyana
Amphibians of Peru
Amphibians of Suriname
Amphibians of Venezuela
Amphibians described in 1864
Taxa named by Franz Steindachner
Taxonomy articles created by Polbot